La Gioconda was a cafe at 9 Denmark Street in London's Tin Pan Alley, where musicians such as David Bowie, Dana Gillespie and Elton John would eat and meet other people in the music business.  The premises subsequently became the Barino coffee bar.  The name was then revived as the Giaconda Dining Room in 2008 which expanded to the Giaconda Dining Rooms before being renamed La Giaconda and then closing in 2014.

Footnotes

References

External links
 Gavin Sutherland on "Tin Pan Alley"
 Mrs Tsk on David Bowie and the original La Gioconda
 Pamela Sidney on the Barino
 Giaconda Dining Rooms named Time Out's best restaurant
 Make some noise about La Giaconda on Denmark Street
Blog by Peter Watts on threat to Denmark Street in 2014, includes photo of original Gioconda cafe.

Defunct restaurants in London
Restaurants in London